In software engineering, a software development process is a process of dividing software development work into smaller, parallel, or sequential steps or sub-processes to improve design and/or product management.  It is also known as a software development life cycle (SDLC).  The methodology may include the pre-definition of specific deliverables and artifacts that are created and completed by a project team to develop or maintain an application.

Most modern development processes can be vaguely described as agile. Other methodologies include waterfall, prototyping, iterative and incremental development, spiral development, rapid application development, and extreme programming.

A life-cycle "model" is sometimes considered a more general term for a category of methodologies and a software development "process" a more specific term to refer to a specific process chosen by a specific organization. For example, there are many specific software development processes that fit the spiral life-cycle model. The field is often considered a subset of the systems development life cycle.

History 

The software development methodology (also known as SDM) framework didn't emerge until the 1960s. According to Elliott (2004), the systems development life cycle (SDLC) can be considered to be the oldest formalized methodology framework for building information systems. The main idea of the SDLC has been "to pursue the development of information systems in a very deliberate, structured and methodical way, requiring each stage of the life cycle––from the inception of the idea to delivery of the final system––to be carried out rigidly and sequentially" within the context of the framework being applied. The main target of this methodology framework in the 1960s was "to develop large scale functional business systems in an age of large scale business conglomerates. Information systems activities revolved around heavy data processing and number crunching routines".

Methodologies, processes, and frameworks range from specific prescriptive steps that can be used directly by an organization in day-to-day work, to flexible frameworks that an organization uses to generate a custom set of steps tailored to the needs of a specific project or group.  In some cases, a "sponsor" or "maintenance" organization distributes an official set of documents that describe the process.  Specific examples include:

 1970s
 Structured programming since 1969
 Cap Gemini SDM, originally from PANDATA, the first English translation was published in 1974. SDM stands for System Development Methodology
 1980s
 Structured systems analysis and design method (SSADM) from 1980 onwards
 Information Requirement Analysis/Soft systems methodology
 1990s
 Object-oriented programming (OOP) developed in the early 1960s and became a dominant programming approach during the mid-1990s
 Rapid application development (RAD), since 1991
 Dynamic systems development method (DSDM), since 1994
 Scrum, since 1995
 Team software process, since 1998
 Rational Unified Process (RUP), maintained by IBM since 1998
 Extreme programming, since 1999
 2000s
 Agile Unified Process (AUP) maintained since 2005 by Scott Ambler
 Disciplined agile delivery (DAD) Supersedes AUP

2010s

 Scaled Agile Framework (SAFe)
 Large-Scale Scrum (LeSS)
 DevOps

It is notable that since DSDM in 1994, all of the methodologies on the above list except RUP have been agile methodologies - yet many organizations, especially governments, still use pre-agile processes (often waterfall or similar). Software process and software quality are closely interrelated; some unexpected facets and effects have been observed in practice  

Among these, another software development process has been established in open source. The adoption of these best practices known and established processes within the confines of a company is called inner source.

Prototyping 

Software prototyping is about creating prototypes, i.e. incomplete versions of the software program being developed.

The basic principles are:

 Prototyping is not a standalone, complete development methodology, but rather an approach to try out particular features in the context of a full methodology (such as incremental, spiral, or rapid application development (RAD)).
 Attempts to reduce inherent project risk by breaking a project into smaller segments and providing more ease-of-change during the development process.
 The client is involved throughout the development process, which increases the likelihood of client acceptance of the final implementation.
 While some prototypes are developed with the expectation that they will be discarded, it is possible in some cases to evolve from prototype to working system.

A basic understanding of the fundamental business problem is necessary to avoid solving the wrong problems, but this is true for all software methodologies.

Methodologies

Agile development 

"Agile software development" refers to a group of software development frameworks based on iterative development, where requirements and solutions evolve via collaboration between self-organizing cross-functional teams. The term was coined in the year 2001 when the Agile Manifesto was formulated.

Agile software development uses iterative development as a basis but advocates a lighter and more people-centric viewpoint than traditional approaches. Agile processes fundamentally incorporate iteration and the continuous feedback that it provides to successively refine and deliver a software system.

The Agile model also includes the following software development processes:

 Dynamic systems development method (DSDM)
 Kanban
 Scrum
 Crystal
 Atern
 Lean software development

Continuous integration 

Continuous integration is the practice of merging all developer working copies to a shared mainline several times a day. Grady Booch first named and proposed CI in his 1991 method, although he did not advocate integrating several times a day. Extreme programming (XP) adopted the concept of CI and did advocate integrating more than once per day – perhaps as many as tens of times per day.

Incremental development 

Various methods are acceptable for combining linear and iterative systems development methodologies, with the primary objective of each being to reduce inherent project risk by breaking a project into smaller segments and providing more ease-of-change during the development process.

There are three main variants of incremental development:

 A series of mini-Waterfalls are performed, where all phases of the Waterfall are completed for a small part of a system, before proceeding to the next increment, or
 Overall requirements are defined before proceeding to evolutionary, mini-Waterfall development of individual increments of a system, or
 The initial software concept, requirements analysis, and design of architecture and system core are defined via Waterfall, followed by incremental implementation, which culminates in installing the final version, a working system.

Rapid application development 

Rapid application development (RAD) is a software development methodology, which favors iterative development and the rapid construction of prototypes instead of large amounts of up-front planning. The "planning" of software developed using RAD is interleaved with writing the software itself. The lack of extensive pre-planning generally allows software to be written much faster, and makes it easier to change requirements.

The rapid development process starts with the development of preliminary data models and business process models using structured techniques. In the next stage, requirements are verified using prototyping, eventually to refine the data and process models. These stages are repeated iteratively; further development results in "a combined business requirements and technical design statement to be used for constructing new systems".

The term was first used to describe a software development process introduced by James Martin in 1991.  According to Whitten (2003), it is a merger of various structured techniques, especially data-driven information technology engineering, with prototyping techniques to accelerate software systems development.

The basic principles of rapid application development are:

 Key objective is for fast development and delivery of a high quality system at a relatively low investment cost.
 Attempts to reduce inherent project risk by breaking a project into smaller segments and providing more ease-of-change during the development process.
 Aims to produce high quality systems quickly, primarily via iterative Prototyping (at any stage of development), active user involvement, and computerized development tools. These tools may include Graphical User Interface (GUI) builders, Computer Aided Software Engineering (CASE) tools, Database Management Systems (DBMS), fourth-generation programming languages, code generators, and object-oriented techniques.
 Key emphasis is on fulfilling the business need, while technological or engineering excellence is of lesser importance.
 Project control involves prioritizing development and defining delivery deadlines or “timeboxes”. If the project starts to slip, emphasis is on reducing requirements to fit the timebox, not in increasing the deadline.
 Generally includes joint application design (JAD), where users are intensely involved in system design, via consensus building in either structured workshops, or electronically facilitated interaction.
 Active user involvement is imperative.
 Iteratively produces production software, as opposed to a throwaway prototype.
 Produces documentation necessary to facilitate future development and maintenance.
 Standard systems analysis and design methods can be fitted into this framework.

Waterfall development 

The waterfall model is a sequential development approach, in which development is seen as flowing steadily downwards (like a waterfall) through several phases, typically:

 Requirements analysis resulting in a software requirements specification
 Software design
 Implementation
 Testing
 Integration, if there are multiple subsystems
 Deployment (or Installation)
 Maintenance

The first formal description of the method is often cited as an article published by Winston W. Royce in 1970, although Royce did not use the term "waterfall" in this article. Royce presented this model as an example of a flawed, non-working model.

The basic principles are:

 The Project is divided into sequential phases, with some overlap and splash back acceptable between phases.
 Emphasis is on planning, time schedules, target dates, budgets, and implementation of an entire system at one time.
 Tight control is maintained over the life of the project via extensive written documentation, formal reviews, and approval/signoff by the user and information technology management occurring at the end of most phases before beginning the next phase.  Written documentation is an explicit deliverable of each phase.

The waterfall model is a traditional engineering approach applied to software engineering. A strict waterfall approach discourages revisiting and revising any prior phase once it is complete. This "inflexibility" in a pure waterfall model has been a source of criticism by supporters of other more "flexible" models.  It has been widely blamed for several large-scale government projects running over budget, over time and sometimes failing to deliver on requirements due to the Big Design Up Front approach. Except when contractually required, the waterfall model has been largely superseded by more flexible and versatile methodologies developed specifically for software development. See Criticism of Waterfall model.

Spiral development 

In 1988, Barry Boehm published a formal software system development "spiral model," which combines some key aspects of the waterfall model and rapid prototyping methodologies, in an effort to combine advantages of top-down and bottom-up concepts.  It provided emphasis in a key area many felt had been neglected by other methodologies: deliberate iterative risk analysis, particularly suited to large-scale complex systems.

The basic principles are:

 Focus is on risk assessment and on minimizing project risk by breaking a project into smaller segments and providing more ease-of-change during the development process, as well as providing the opportunity to evaluate risks and weigh consideration of project continuation throughout the life cycle.
 "Each cycle involves a progression through the same sequence of steps, for each part of the product and for each of its levels of elaboration, from an overall concept-of-operation document down to the coding of each individual program."
 Each trip around the spiral traverses four basic quadrants: (1) determine objectives, alternatives, and constraints of the iteration, and (2) evaluate alternatives; Identify and resolve risks; (3) develop and verify deliverables from the iteration; and (4) plan the next iteration.
 Begin each cycle with an identification of stakeholders and their "win conditions", and end each cycle with review and commitment.

Shape Up 
Shape Up is a software development approach introduced by Basecamp in 2018. It is a set of principles and techniques that Basecamp developed internally to overcome the problem of projects dragging on with no clear end. Its primary target audience is remote teams. Shape Up has no estimation and velocity tracking, backlogs, or sprints, unlike Waterfall, Agile, or Scrum. Instead, those concepts are replaced with appetite, betting, and cycles. As of 2022, besides Basecamp, notable organizations that have adopted Shape Up include UserVoice and Block.

Cycles 
Through trials and errors, Basecamp found that the ideal cycle length is 6 weeks. This 6 week period is long enough to build a meaningful feature and still short enough to induce a sense of urgency.

Shaping 
Shaping is the process of preparing work before being handed over to designers and engineers. Shaped work spells out the solution's main UI elements, identifies rabbit holes, and outlines clear scope boundaries. It is meant to be rough and to leave finer details for builders (designers and engineers) to solve, allowing the builders to exercise their creativity and make trade-offs. Shaped work is documented in the form of a pitch using an online document solution that supports commenting, allowing team members to contribute technical information asynchronously. Such comments are crucial for uncovering hidden surprises that may derail the project.

Before a cycle begins, stakeholders hold a betting table, where pitches are reviewed. For each pitch, a decision is made to either bet on it or drop it.

Appetite 
The way Shape Up determines how much time is allocated to a project is diametrically opposed to other methodologies. Shape Up starts with an appetite (for example, 6 weeks) and ends with a solution design that can be delivered within this constraint. The appetite becomes a hard deadline for the project's builders.

Building 
Shape Up is a two-track system where shapers and builders work in parallel. Work that is being shaped in the current cycle may be given to designers and engineers to build in a future cycle.

Recognizing the technical uncertainties that come with building, progress is tracked using a chart that visualizes the metaphor of the hill, aptly named the hill chart. The uphill phase is where builders are still working out their approach, while the downhill is where unknowns have been eliminated. Builders proactively and asynchronously self-report progress using an interactive online hill chart on Basecamp or Jira, shifting focus from done or not-done statuses to unknown or solved problems. The use of hill chart replaces the process of reporting linear statuses in scrum or Kanban standup.

Advanced methodologies 

Other high-level software project methodologies include:

 Behavior-driven development and business process management.
 Chaos model - The main rule always resolve the most important issue first.
 Incremental funding methodology - an iterative approach
 Lightweight methodology - a general term for methods that only have a few rules and practices
 Structured systems analysis and design method - a specific version of waterfall
 Slow programming, as part of the larger Slow Movement, emphasizes careful and gradual work without (or minimal) time pressures. Slow programming aims to avoid bugs and overly quick release schedules.
 V-Model (software development) - an extension of the waterfall model
 Unified Process (UP) is an iterative software development methodology framework, based on Unified Modeling Language (UML). UP organizes the development of software into four phases, each consisting of one or more executable iterations of the software at that stage of development: inception, elaboration, construction, and guidelines. Many tools and products exist to facilitate UP implementation. One of the more popular versions of UP is the Rational Unified Process (RUP).
Big Bang methodology - an approach for small or undefined projects, generally consisting of little to no planning with high risk.

Process meta-models 

Some "process models" are abstract descriptions for evaluating, comparing, and improving the specific process adopted by an organization.

 ISO/IEC 12207 is the international standard describing the method to select, implement, and monitor the life cycle for software.
 The Capability Maturity Model Integration (CMMI) is one of the leading models and is based on best practices. Independent assessments grade organizations on how well they follow their defined processes, not on the quality of those processes or the software produced. CMMI has replaced CMM.
 ISO 9000 describes standards for a formally organized process to manufacture a product and the methods of managing and monitoring progress. Although the standard was originally created for the manufacturing sector, ISO 9000 standards have been applied to software development as well. Like CMMI, certification with ISO 9000 does not guarantee the quality of the end result, only that formalized business processes have been followed.
 ISO/IEC 15504 Information technology—Process assessment is also known as Software Process Improvement Capability Determination (SPICE), is a "framework for the assessment of software processes". This standard is aimed at setting out a clear model for process comparison. SPICE is used much like CMMI. It models processes to manage, control, guide and monitors software development. This model is then used to measure what a development organization or project team actually does during software development. This information is analyzed to identify weaknesses and drive improvement. It also identifies strengths that can be continued or integrated into common practice for that organization or team.
 ISO/IEC 24744 Software Engineering—Metamodel for Development Methodologies, is a power type-based metamodel for software development methodologies.
 SPEM 2.0 by the Object Management Group.
 Soft systems methodology - a general method for improving management processes.
 Method engineering - a general method for improving information system processes.

In practice 

A variety of such frameworks have evolved over the years, each with its own recognized strengths and weaknesses. One software development methodology framework is not necessarily suitable for use by all projects. Each of the available methodology frameworks is best suited to specific kinds of projects, based on various technical, organizational, project, and team considerations.

Software development organizations implement process methodologies to ease the process of development. Sometimes, contractors may require methodologies employed, an example is the U.S. defense industry, which requires a rating based on process models to obtain contracts.  The international standard for describing the method of selecting, implementing, and monitoring the life cycle for software is ISO/IEC 12207.

A decades-long goal has been to find repeatable, predictable processes that improve productivity and quality. Some try to systematize or formalize the seemingly unruly task of designing software. Others apply project management techniques to designing software. Large numbers of software projects do not meet their expectations in terms of functionality, cost, or delivery schedule - see List of failed and overbudget custom software projects for some notable examples.

Organizations may create a Software Engineering Process Group (SEPG), which is the focal point for process improvement. Composed of line practitioners who have varied skills, the group is at the center of the collaborative effort of everyone in the organization who is involved with software engineering process improvement.

A particular development team may also agree to program environment details, such as which integrated development environment is used one or more dominant programming paradigms, programming style rules, or choice of specific software libraries or software frameworks.  These details are generally not dictated by the choice of model or general methodology.

See also 

 Systems development life cycle
 Computer-aided software engineering (some of these tools support specific methodologies)
 List of software development philosophies
 Outline of software engineering
 OpenUP
 Project management
 Software development
 Software development effort estimation
 Software release life cycle
 Top-down and bottom-up design#Computer science

References

External links 

 Selecting a development approach at cms.hhs.gov.
 Gerhard Fischer, "The Software Technology of the 21st Century: From Software Reuse to Collaborative Software Design", 2001
 Subway map of agile practices at Agile Alliance

 
Methodology
Software engineering